William S. Smith House, also known as Croswell House and Phoebus House, is a historic home located at Oriole, Somerset County, Maryland. It is a two-story cross-shaped frame Queen Anne house, built about 1890.  It features by a pair of three-story entrance towers with pyramidal roofs marked by kicked eaves, wooden finials, and weathervanes.

It was listed on the National Register of Historic Places in 1991.

References

External links
, including photo from 1986, at Maryland Historical Trust

Houses in Somerset County, Maryland
Houses on the National Register of Historic Places in Maryland
Houses completed in 1890
Queen Anne architecture in Maryland
National Register of Historic Places in Somerset County, Maryland
1890 establishments in Maryland